The British Rail Class 450 Desiro are third-rail DC electric multiple unit (EMU) passenger trains that entered service during 2003. Used for outer-suburban services, they were built with both first- and standard-class accommodation.

The Desiro UK family also includes units of Classes 185, 350, 360, 380 and 444.

Along with the Class 444 Desiro, the Class 450 units are operated by South Western franchise operator South Western Railway.

Introduction 

In April 2001, 785 vehicles were ordered by South West Trains in order to complete the replacement of its slam-door rolling stock, in accordance with its franchise commitment to do so by 2005, as the slam-door trains, many of which were more than 40 years old, did not meet modern health and safety requirements. Introduction to service was delayed by the required power supply upgrades capable of powering the new trains, which feature air conditioning, a feature not present in the slam-door trains they replaced. In the December 2004 timetable change, the Class 450 Desiro began serving most intended routes, although introduction was delayed until June 2005 in some areas.  The units are leased by Angel Trains to South West Trains.

Sixty-eight new vehicles were ordered by South West Trains as a replacement to the growth order which was diverted to form the similar  range of electric multiple units.

Operations 

Class 450 units operate suburban, outer-suburban, and regional services from London Waterloo. They are used on all SWR lines except the West of England Main Line and the Eastleigh to Romsey Line.

On occasion Class 450 units are also used on the Portsmouth Direct Line for services between Waterloo and Portsmouth Harbour, in place of the intended Class 444. The difference in comfortparticularly the higher-density 2+3 seating arrangement used on the Class 450 fleethas prompted complaints from some passengers affected by the substitution.

Both the Class 444 and 450 fleets are maintained at the purpose-built Northam Traincare Facility in Southampton, which is equipped to perform both preventative and corrective maintenance, deep-cleaning, and overhauls on up to eight units simultaneously.

Class 450/2 and more orders 
Originally, SWT's order with Siemens was for 100 four-car sets (the current 450/0) and 32 five-car sets, intended as Class 450/2 for inner-suburban use. The Strategic Rail Authority, however, did not agree to the terms required, such as the lengthening of platforms and changes to railway infrastructure. As a result, the 32 five-car sets were cancelled and the 160 vehicles redistributed; an extra 10 four-car sets were added to the SWT order, while the remaining 120 vehicles were then ordered as 30 four-car sets of the dual-voltage  for Silverlink and Central Trains.

Subsequently, SWT received further 17 four-car sets, bringing the total number of Class 450 units up to 127. These trains were delivered in 2006, not long after the last of the first order was delivered. 450101 was damaged in Belgium and returned to Wildenrath to have repairs conducted by Siemens, delaying its entry into the UK.

Class 450/5 modifications 
In January 2008, 28 Class 450/0 sets were modified and re-numbered in the Class 450/5 series, for use on services between Waterloo and Windsor, the Hounslow Loop Line, as well as between Waterloo and Weybridge. They had their first-class seating removed and replaced with 2+3 formation standard-class seating, and some other seats were removed to provide more standing capacity; extra handrails were also provided. The numbers modified are 450043 to 450070, which have become 450543 to 450570 respectively and displayed the letters HC (denoting 'High Capacity') above the unit number on the front of the sets. The modifications were carried out at the Bournemouth Traincare Depot.

In anticipation of the Class 458/5 modifications for use on the Windsor Lines, the 450/5 sub class had the First Class reinstated, and they are now used generally across the SWR routes. These trains retain their 4505xx number as the standard seating configuration remains different. As they complete their latest interior refurbishment, during late 2019, they are being returned to their original numbers.

Refresh 

South Western Railway, as part of its franchise award in 2017, has carried out a refurbishment programme on its Class 450 fleet. As part of this, every unit has been deep cleaned with carpets and seat covers replaced and every two seats in Standard Class have had a plug socket fitted. First Class has been reduced to eight seats per set end (16 seats per set), and features new leather seats and tables with wireless charging facilities. As part of this work, Class 450/5s have also been similarly refurbished, and renumbered to their original numbers, so all Class 450s will once again share a common layout.

Accidents and incidents 
On 6 November 2017, unit 450 025 was derailed near . Four people were injured; over 300 passengers were evacuated from the train. The accident was caused by track spread. Neither Network Rail nor London Underground had inspected the track for many years, due to a misunderstanding as to who was responsible for maintaining a  stretch of line.

Fleet details

Interiors

Illustration

Named units
Unit 450114 was named Fairbridge Investing in the Future.

References

External links 

 Class 450 "Desiro" - South Western Railway
 Class 450 refurbishment by Angel Trains

450
Siemens multiple units
Train-related introductions in 2003
750 V DC multiple units